Nowe Sioło  (Nove Selo) is a village in the administrative district of Gmina Cieszanów, within Lubaczów County, Subcarpathian Voivodeship, in south-eastern Poland.

The village has a population of 1,300.

References

Villages in Lubaczów County